Glycinamide is a organic compound with the molecular formula H2NCH2C(O)NH2.  It is the amide derivative of the amino acid glycine. It is a water-soluble, white solid.  Amino acid amides, such as glycinamide are prepared by treating the amino acid ester with ammonia.

It is a ligand for transition metals.

The hydrochloride salt of glycinamide, glycinamide hydrochloride, is one of Good's buffers with a pH in the physiological range.  Glycinamide hydrochloride has a pKa near the physiological pH (8.20 at 20°C), making it useful in cell culture work. Its ΔpKa/°C is -0.029 and it has a solubility in water at 0 °C of 6.4 M.

Glycinamide is a reagent used in the synthesis of glycineamide ribonucleotide (an intermediate in de novo purine biosynthesis).

References

Buffer solutions
Carboxamides
Amines